Hugh Goddard (born 24 August 1996) is an Australian rules footballer who formerly played for the  and  football clubs in the Australian Football League (AFL).

AFL career
Goddard a second cousin of former St Kilda player and former Essendon captain and player Brendon Goddard. He was drafted as pick 21 in the 2014 AFL draft. He grew up in Geelong and attended Melbourne Grammar School as a boarder. He made his debut in round 16 of the 2015 AFL season in St Kilda's loss against , playing alongside former Geelong Falcons teammate Paddy McCartin.

In the 2018 AFL Rookie Draft, Goddard was selected with the first pick by Carlton, after spending time training with the club. Goddard made his Carlton debut in Round 17 of the 2019 season against Sydney at the SCG and played a total of two games for Carlton.  He played most of the season with Carlton's  Northern Blues, winning the Laurie Hill Trophy as club best and fairest. He was delisted at the end of 2020.

References

External links

Meet Hugh Goddard

1996 births
Living people
St Kilda Football Club players
Sandringham Football Club players
Geelong Falcons players
Australian rules footballers from Victoria (Australia)
People educated at Melbourne Grammar School
Carlton Football Club players
Preston Football Club (VFA) players
People educated at Geelong College